Los Angeles CityBeat was an alternative weekly newspaper in Los Angeles, California, debuting June 12, 2003. The publication ceased production with the March 26, 2009, issue. LA CityBeat was available every Thursday at more than 1,500 distribution locations throughout the Los Angeles area, with an initial circulation of 100,000 (dropping to 65,000 in its final year).

LA CityBeat was a member of the Alternative Weekly Network and was a rare unanimous recommendation for membership in the Association of Alternative Newsweeklies. Other unanimous membership votes have included New York City's The Village Voice and Halifax's The Coast. The online home of the weekly newspaper, lacitybeat.com, hosted more than 12,000 unique visitors per day.

Staff
The inaugural staff included editor-in-chief Steve Appleford, publisher Rick Haelig, deputy editor Dean Kuipers, arts editor Natalie Nichols, award-winning film editor Andy Klein, art director Dana Collins, staff writer Dennis Romero, and calendar editor Rebecca Epstein. Donnell Alexander joined later as a staff writer.

Contributors included Andrew Berardini, Perry Crowe, Mindy Farrabee, Michael Collins, Cole Coonce, Mick Farren, Richard Foss, Ron Garmon, Andrew Gumbel, Tom Hayden, Erik Himmelsbach, Greg Katz, Ken Layne, Alfred Lee, Richard Meltzer, Anthony Miller, Chris Morris, Donna Perlmutter, Don Shirley, Kirk Silsbee, Joshua Sindell, Greg Stacy, Annette Stark, David L. Ulin, Bill Holdship and Don Waller. Graphic artists who contributed regularly included Jordan Crane, Tony Millionaire, Ted Rall, and Brian Stauffer.

Photographer Gary Leonard's "Take My Picture" (a long-running photo feature that originally debuted in Los Angeles Reader and then New Times LA) appeared weekly in LA CityBeat for more than five years.

References 

City Beat
Alternative weekly newspapers published in the United States
Publications established in 2003
Publications disestablished in 2009
Weekly newspapers published in California